Thyanta is a genus of stink bugs in the family Pentatomidae. There are about 19 described species in Thyanta.

Species
These 19 species belong to the genus Thyanta:

 Thyanta accerra McAtee, 1919
 Thyanta boliviensis Rider
 Thyanta brasiliensis Jensen-Haarup, 1928
 Thyanta calceata (Say, 1832)
 Thyanta casta Stål, 1862
 Thyanta cubensis Barber & Bruner
 Thyanta custator (Fabricius, 1803) (red-shouldered stink bug)
 Thyanta emarginata Rider
 Thyanta humilis
 Thyanta maculata
 Thyanta pallidovirens (Stål, 1859) (red-shouldered stink bug)
 Thyanta patruelis Stal, 1859
 Thyanta perditor (Fabricius, 1794) (neotropical red-shouldered stink bug)
 Thyanta pseudocasta Blatchley, 1926
 Thyanta punctiventris Van Duzee
 Thyanta sinuata Rider
 Thyanta spectabilis Ruckes, 1957
 Thyanta testacea (Dallas, 1851)
 Thyanta xerotica Rider

References

Further reading

External links

 

Pentatomidae genera
Articles created by Qbugbot
Pentatomini